Maurice O'Connell (1935 – 15 June 2022) was an Irish Gaelic footballer and hurler. At club level he played with Abbeydorney and was also a member of the Kerry senior teams as a dual player.

Career

O'Connell first played at club level with Abbeydorney. He won a Kerry MFC title with the St Brendan's divisional side in 1953 and later lost consecutive Kerry SFC finals with the team. He also lost a Kerry SHC final with Abbeydorney in 1954. O'Connell first appeared on the inter-county scene as a member of the Kerry senior hurling team that won the 1956-57 National Hurling League Division 2 title. He was later called up to the Kerry senior football team and came on as a substitute for Mick O'Connell in the 1959 All-Ireland final defeat of Galway. O'Connell later lined out with the Lancashire team that lost the 1963 All-Ireland junior final to Kerry.

Personal life and death

O'Connell entered the priesthood in the early 1950s, attending All Hallows College in Dublin. He moved to Greater Manchester in 1959 and spent six years at St Anne’s Church in Crumpsall. O'Connell later spent 14 years at Salford Cathedral and a decade at St Teresa’s in Stretford, before spending over 25 years at St Joseph's in Reddish. He died on 15 June 2022, aged 87.

Honours

Abbeydorney
North Kerry Intermediate Hurling Championship: 1954
Kerry Junior Hurling Championship: 1951

St Brendan's District Board
Kerry Minor Football Championship: 1953

Kerry
All-Ireland Senior Football Championship: 1959
Munster Senior Football Championship: 1958, 1959
National Football League: 1958-59
National Hurling League Division 2: 1956-57

References

1935 births
2022 deaths
Abbeydorney hurlers
Kerry inter-county Gaelic footballers
20th-century Irish Roman Catholic priests
21st-century Irish Roman Catholic priests
Roman Catholic clergy in Europe
Alumni of All Hallows College, Dublin